Sergiyevskoye is a rural locality (a selo) in Sergiyevskoye Rural Settlement of Giaginsky District, Adygea, Russia. The population of this village was 1,358 as of 2018. There are 28 streets.

Geography 
Sergiyevskoye is located 33 km southeast of Giaginskaya (the district's administrative centre) by road. Shishkinsky is the nearest rural locality.

Ethnicity 
The village is inhabited by Russians.

References 

Rural localities in Giaginsky District